Fausto Manuel Pinto Rosas (born 8 August 1983) is a Mexican former professional footballer who played as a left-back.

Club career
On December 23, 2008, Fausto Pinto left C.F. Pachuca and started playing with Cruz Azul. Hugo Sánchez, Mexican coach asked for Fausto Pinto's services for the 2007 CONCACAF Gold Cup held in the United States. However, Pinto's debut did not happen until the 2007 Copa América against Brazil in a 2–0 win.

Honours
Pachuca
Mexican Primera División: Invierno 2001, Clausura 2006, Clausura 2007
CONCACAF Champions' Cup: 2002, 2007, 2008
Copa Sudamericana: 2006
North American SuperLiga: 2007

Cruz Azul
CONCACAF Champions League: 2013–14

Mexico
CONCACAF Gold Cup: 2009

Individual
CONCACAF Gold Cup All-Tournament Team: 2009

References

External links

1983 births
Living people
Mexico under-20 international footballers
Mexico international footballers
CONCACAF Gold Cup-winning players
2007 CONCACAF Gold Cup players
2007 Copa América players
C.F. Pachuca players
Cruz Azul footballers
Deportivo Toluca F.C. players
Liga MX players
Association football defenders
Sportspeople from Culiacán
2009 CONCACAF Gold Cup players
Footballers from Sinaloa
Mexican footballers